Outlaw Justice is a 1932 American pre-Code western film directed by Armand Schaefer and starring Jack Hoxie, Dorothy Gulliver and Donald Keith. It was produced as a second feature for release by Majestic Pictures.

Synopsis
Panamint Jack is on the run for the law, falsely accused of murdering a sheriff who is in fact still alive. He takes shelter at the Taggart ranch and discovers that June Taggart is being cheated out of her land.

Cast
 Jack Hoxie as 	Panamint Jack
 Dorothy Gulliver as 	June Taggart
 Donald Keith as	Bob Taggart
 Charles King as 	Volger 
 Jack Trent as 	Faro Black
 Chris-Pin Martin as 	El Diablo 
 Tom London as Henchman Hank
 Walter Shumway as Sheriff Tom Rankin
 Jack Rockwell as 	Sheriff Jake
 Pete Morrison as 	Henchman 
 Slim Whitaker as Townsman
 Hank Bell as Henchman 
 Horace B. Carpenter as Drunk
 Kermit Maynard as 	Man Who Ejects the Drunk
 Dynamite the Horse as Dynamite, Jack's horse

References

Bibliography
 Rainey, Buck. Those Fabulous Serial Heroines: Their Lives and Films. Scarecrow Press, 1990.

External links
 

1932 films
1932 Western (genre) films
American black-and-white films
American Western (genre) films
Films directed by Armand Schaefer
Majestic Pictures films
1930s English-language films
1930s American films